The White Synagogue of Joniškis is a former synagogue in Joniškis, Lithuania. Located next to Red Synagogue of Joniškis.

History 
In 1797 the permit to build a synagogue in Joniškis was granted. Synagogue completed in 1823.

After World War II, the synagogue was converted into warehouse, later on into gym.

Current state 

The White Synagogue of Joniškis was renovated and re-opened to the public.

See also
Lithuanian Jews

References 

Synagogues in Joniškis
Synagogues completed in 1823
1823 in Lithuania